Carol Plum-Ucci (born August 16, 1957 in Atlantic City, New Jersey) is a young adult novelist and essayist. Plum-Ucci's most famous work to date is The Body of Christopher Creed, for which she won a Michael L. Printz Award in 2002 and was named a Finalist to the Edgar Allan Poe Award. Describing her subjects as "the most common, timeless, and most heart-felt teenagers," Plum-Ucci is widely recognized for her use of the South Jersey shore to set scenes for engaging characters embracing suspense themes.

Early life, education, and career 
Plum-Ucci was born to Neil Plum, owner of Plum Funeral Homes and a funeral home singer, and  teacher Ellen Ingersoll Plum. As Plum-Ucci grew up she knew she wanted to write books. The Body of Christopher Creed was her "cloud song."
Plum-Ucci grew up on the barrier island of Brigantine, New Jersey, where she attended the public schools until the age of thirteen.  She then went to Atlantic City Friends’ School, where her grandmother, Neva Ingersoll, taught advanced high school mathematics.  She graduated from Holy Spirit High School in 1975.  Her father, Neil Plum, and her paternal grandmother, Ads Plum, partnered in the funeral business, owning Plum Funeral Homes in Brigantine, Atlantic City, and Ventnor.  Plum-Ucci largely attributes her writer's imagination to lying awake at night, above the Brigantine funeral parlor, listening to the sounds downstairs.

She received her bachelor's in communication from Purdue University in 1979.  She served as feature editor of the Purdue Exponent, a two-year post. After Purdue, Plum-Ucci was a freelance writer in the Chicago area for several years. She became Assistant to the Producer of the Miss America Pageant in Atlantic City in 1984. She later served as Staff Writer and Director of Publications of the Miss America Organization and Miss America Scholarship Foundation, producing up to a dozen publications a year for volunteers and participants.  Plum-Ucci retired in 1999, two months after receiving her first advance on royalties from The Body of Christopher Creed from Harcourt—the first novel she sold.

She has been a resident of Absecon, New Jersey.

Novels 

 The Body of Christopher Creed, 2000 
 What Happened to Lani Garver, 2002 
 The She, 2003 
 The Night My Sister Went Missing, 2006 
 Streams of Babel, 2008 
 The Fire will fall, 2010

Awards 
2007 Nominated for the Edgar Allan Poe Award for The Night My Sister Went Missing
2003 Nominated for Michael L. Printz Award for What Happened to Lani Garver
2001 Won the Michael L. Printz Award for The Body of Christopher Creed
2000 Won worst cliff hanger award for The Body of Christopher Creed

References

External links 
 Carol Plum-Ucci’s Web Site
 

1957 births
Living people
21st-century American novelists
American women novelists
American writers of young adult literature
American children's writers
Edgar Award winners
Purdue University alumni
American thriller writers
People from Absecon, New Jersey
People from Brigantine, New Jersey
Writers from Atlantic City, New Jersey
American women essayists
American women children's writers
21st-century American women writers
Women writers of young adult literature
Women thriller writers
21st-century American essayists
Novelists from New Jersey